The 2017 Big South Conference softball tournament was held at Longwood University's Lancer Field from May 10 through May 14, 2017. Following the departure of Coastal Carolina for the Sun Belt Conference, the Big South reconfigured the tournament to a six-team event. Longwood won their third straight tournament, and fourth of their five seasons in the conference, becoming the first tournament host to win since Radford in 2008.

Seeds
The top two seeds had byes to the second round. Teams were seeded by record within the conference, with a tiebreaker system to seed teams with identical conference records.

Tournament

All times listed are Eastern Daylight Time.

References

Big South Tournament
Big South Conference softball tournament